Steam museums around the world include:

Australia
Powerhouse Museum in Sydney

Canada
Hamilton Waterworks in Hamilton, Ontario
Ontario Agricultural Museum in Milton, Ontario
Steam Era in Milton, Ontario

Channel Islands
Pallot Heritage Steam Museum in Jersey

Ireland
Steam Museum, Straffan

United Kingdom
Bolton Steam Museum
Bressingham Steam and Gardens - Gardens, Steam railways and museum of steam vehicles
 Coldharbour Mill - a working textile mill museum with steam and water power
Crofton Beam Engines
Hollycombe Steam Collection
Kempton Park Steam Engines
Kew Bridge Steam Museum

United States
Antique Powerland, Brooks, Oregon
New England Wireless and Steam Museum East Greenwich, Rhode Island

See also
 Pumping station#List of pumping stations, many of which are, or were, steam-powered.
 List of steam fairs, events where steam engines, particularly traction engines, may be seen working'.

References

Steam
 
Museums
Museums